The green water snake (Nerodia cyclopion) is a common species of nonvenomous natricine snake endemic to the southeastern United States.

Geographic range
N. cyclopion is distributed from the Florida panhandle westward to Louisiana, and northward through the Mississippi Valley into southern Illinois.

More precisely, it is found in southwestern Alabama, southeastern Arkansas, northwestern Florida, southern Illinois, southwestern Indiana, western Kentucky, Louisiana, southern Mississippi, southeastern Missouri, western Tennessee, and southeastern Texas.

The type locality is New Orleans, Louisiana.

Description
N. cyclopion differs from most other species of North American water snakes by having one or more small scales under the eye, giving the appearance of a ring of small plates around the eye, a character shared only with the species N. floridana.

A heavy-bodied snake, N. cyclopion is dark green, olive, or brown dorsally. Ventrally, it is yellowish on the anterior third, and the on remainder dark brown with yellow or white semicircles.

N. cyclopion averages 76–140 cm (30-55 inches) in total length (including tail).

Habitat
N. cyclopion prefers still waters such as bayous, lakes, marshes, ponds, sluggish streams, and swamps. It is sometimes found in brackish water.

Diet
The green water snake preys upon crayfish, frogs, and fish.

Subspecies
The former subspecies, Nerodia cyclopion floridana (Goff, 1936) - Florida green water snake, has been elevated to a full species, Nerodia floridana.

Reproduction

The green water snake is ovoviviparous. Mating takes place on land in April. The young are born in July or August, and are about 25 cm (10 in) long. Brood size varies from 7 to 101, depending on the size of the female. The females, which are larger than the males and have two more dorsal scale rows, may weigh over 4.1 kg (9 lb).

References

External links

Further reading
Duméril, A.-M.-C., G. Bibron and A. Duméril. 1854. Erpétologie générale ou histoire naturelle complète des reptiles, Tome septième.—Première partie. Comprenant l'histoire des serpents non venimeux. (=General Herpetology or Complete Natural History of Reptiles, Volume 7.—Part 1. Containing the [Natural] History of Nonvenomous Snakes). Roret. Paris. xvi + 780 pp. (Tropidonotus cyclopion, pp. 576–577.)
Goff, C.C. 1936. Distribution and Variation of a New Species of Water Snake, Natrix cyclopion floridana, with a Discussion of its Relationships. Occasional Papers. Mus. Zool. Univ. Michigan (327): 1-12.
Morris, Percy A. 1948. Boy's Book of Snakes: How to Recognize and Understand Them. A volume of the Humanizing Science Series, edited by Jacques Cattell. Ronald Press. New York. viii + 185 pp. ("The Green Water Snake", pp. 82–84, 180.)

Nerodia
Reptiles described in 1854
Reptiles of the United States
Fauna of the Southeastern United States
Taxa named by André Marie Constant Duméril
Taxa named by Gabriel Bibron
Taxa named by Auguste Duméril